Peace Tree may refer to:

Trees
 Peace Tree, any of several trees planted as an inspiration by the film The Peace Tree
 Tree of Peace, the species of tree associated with the Iroquois symbol for peace
 International World War Peace Tree, a tree celebrating the end of World War I and symbolizing an alliance between Germany and the United States

Popular culture
 The Peace Tree, a 2005 film

Geography
 Peace Tree, Ontario

Other
 Tree of Peace, an Iroquois symbol